Kanjikode railway station (code: KJKD) is a railway station in the Palakkad district, Kerala and falls under the Palakkad railway division of the Southern Railway zone, Indian Railways.

Railway stations in Palakkad district